Innocent Eyes is a compilation album by Australian singer-songwriter Delta Goodrem, released only in Japan on 11 October 2006 through Sony Music Japan. The album comprises songs from her first two studio albums, Innocent Eyes and Mistaken Identity, as well as two new songs: "Never Fades Away" and "Flawed", which was released as a single.

Behind the album
In an attempt to break the singer in America, an album composed of tracks from her first two albums—some remixed—plus one new song was readied for release. In advance of the album, "Lost Without You" was released as a single, peaking at  number eighteen on the U.S. Billboard Adult Contemporary chart.

Originally scheduled for November 2005, the album's release was pushed back numerous times. The project was eventually shelved in the US but an altered version with an additional new song came out in Japan on 11 October 2006 as Innocent Eyes.  The first single, "Flawed", became a hit on the Japanese digital download chart and was featured in the Japanese film Adiantum Blue. The album debuted on the charts at number thirty-three, selling 4,000 copies. In its fifth week it peaked at number nineteen with total sales of 23,758. The album went to number eight on the Japanese International album chart with total sales of 46,445.

Resurgence
After the Japanese release of "In This Life" in January 2008, Innocent Eyes re-entered the Japanese charts, appearing at #5 on the digital albums chart and at #25 on the overall albums chart.

Track listing

Charts

References

Delta Goodrem albums
2006 compilation albums
Sony Music Australia compilation albums